Nobody for Everybody is the Japanese debut EP / video album by South Korean girl group Wonder Girls. The title song is the same album name,, taken from their third Korean mini-album, The Wonder Years: Trilogy. This is the fourth language that "Nobody" has been released in following the original Korean, then English and Chinese. The EP consisted of Japanese version of "Nobody", as well as 2012 re-recordings of "Nobody" (Korean and English), "Saying I Love You", and "You're Out" to include Hyerim's vocals, who entered the group in 2010, replacing group's original member Sunmi who rejoined the group in 2015. The video albums features thirty-six videos (music videos, live performances etc.).

Background
In May 2012 Wonder Girls announced their official debut into the Japanese market with DefStar Records with a Japanese version of "Nobody", "Nobody ～あなたしか見えない～". After the release of a Japanese CF for a cosmetic company Kowa in Japan for MarshPuff, a snippet of a Japanese version of "Nobody was revealed". JYP Entertainment announced that Wonder Girls has signed with a subsidiary of Sony Music Japan, under DefStar Records. JYPE stated, "Wonder Girls have received numerous inquiries from Japan and observing their advertisement and music business flourishing even without their official introduction, the members have expressed their intention for entering the Japanese market."

After announcing Wonder Girls as a spokesmodel for Kowa's new advertisement for "Marshpuff", JYPE requested the Japanese record label to listen to the Wonder Girls' released albums, including the latest singles, before deciding on the debut song. The label had strong mutual interest in "Nobody", so it was chosen as the title song for their first Japanese album.

Release and promotion
The EP was released on July 25, 2012, in three different versions. 
Standard edition: CD 
Limited edition A: CD + DVD 
Limited edition B: CD + DVD 
EP was promoted with Japanese version of their single "Nobody".

Track listing

Charts

Video album
A video album with the title Wonder Girls: Nobody for Everybody was distributed by Advance Sound Production Co. Ltd..

References

Wonder Girls albums
2012 EPs
Dance-pop albums by South Korean artists
Sony Music Entertainment Japan EPs
Japanese-language EPs